The following is a list of all the major statistics and records for the 2017 Women's Cricket World Cup, held in England and Wales from 24 June to 23 July 2017. It was the eleventh edition of the Women's Cricket World Cup. Notable records include England scoring 377 against Pakistan, the second-highest World Cup team score, and Anya Shrubsole taking 6/26 in the Final against India, the third best bowling figures in a World Cup.

Team

Highest team totals
England's total of 377 against Pakistan is the second-highest team score in a World Cup.

Batting

Most runs
The 2017 World Cup had three players scoring over 400 runs in the tournament for the first time World Cup history, the previous best being two players over 400 runs in a tournament, in 1997.

Highest individual scores
Chamari Atapattu's 178* was the second highest World Cup score of all time and the fourth highest in all WODIs.

Highest partnerships
Tammy Beaumout and Sarah Taylor's partnership of 275 for the 2nd wicket is the highest partnership for any wicket in World Cup history, and the third-highest in all WODIs.

Highest partnerships by wicket
Alex Blackwell and Kristen Beams' partnership of 76 for the 10th wicket is the highest in WODIs.

Bowling

Most wickets

Best bowling
Anya Shrubsole's figures of 6/46 are the third best bowling figures in a World Cup.

Fielding

Most catches

Most catches in a match

Wicket-keeping

Most dismissals

Most dismissals in a match

Team of the Tournament 
The ICC announced its team of the tournament on 24 July 2017.

 Tammy Beaumont (England)
 Laura Wolvaardt (South Africa)
 Mithali Raj (captain) (India)
 Ellyse Perry (Australia)
 Sarah Taylor (wicketkeeper) (England)
 Harmanpreet Kaur (India)
 Deepti Sharma (India)
 Marizanne Kapp (South Africa)
 Dane van Niekerk (South Africa)
 Anya Shrubsole (England)
 Alex Hartley (England)
 Nat Sciver (12th) (England)

References

statistics